The Federation of Communication and Transport (FCT) was a trade union representing workers in the communication and transportation industries in Spain.

The union was founded in 1997, when the Federation of Transport, Communication and Sea merged with the Federation of Paper, Graphic Arts, Communications and Entertainment.  Like both its predecessors, it affiliated to the Workers' Commissions.  In 2009, it merged with the Federation of Public Administration Employees, to form the Federation of Citizens' Services.

References

Communications trade unions
Transportation trade unions
Trade unions established in 1997
Trade unions disestablished in 2009
Trade unions in Spain